The Canton of Saint-Doulchard is a canton situated in the Cher département and in the Centre-Val de Loire region of France. It has 15,095 inhabitants (2018).

Geography 
A suburban area of farming and light industry centred on the town of Saint-Doulchard, a northern suburb of Bourges.

The canton comprises 3 communes:
La Chapelle-Saint-Ursin
Marmagne
Saint-Doulchard

Population

See also 
 Arrondissements of the Cher department
 Cantons of the Cher department
 Communes of the Cher department

References

Saint-Doulchard